Gerard J. M. van den Aardweg (born 1936, Haarlem) is a Dutch psychologist, psychotherapist in private practice, and conspiracy theorist. He has spoken and written on homosexuality,  parapsychology, near-death experience, and anti-abortion matters. 

During the 2015 Irish referendum on same-sex marriage, he "claimed the Nazi party was ‘rooted’ in homosexuals", along with other conspiracy theories.

Biography 
Gerard J. M. van den Aardweg received his PhD in psychology from the University of Amsterdam with a dissertation published in 1967 under the title "Homophilia, neurosis and compulsive self-pity". It was the Netherlands' first dissertation on homosexuality. 
Van den Aardweg rejects the idea that homosexuality is a biologically innate trait. Instead, he calls homosexuality (an expression of) "a disease of infantile self pity." Van den Aardweg believes that no one is born gay, that there are no gay children, and that "[h]omosexuality is not equal to heterosexuality. Scientifically this is absolutely absurd."

He has been a former member of the National Association for Research and Therapy of Homosexuality's (NARTH) Scientific Advisory Committee.

Selected works
 
 
 The Battle for Normality: Self-Therapy for Homosexual Persons  (1997)
 Hungry Souls  (2009)

References

1936 births
Living people
People from Haarlem
Dutch psychologists
Psychotherapists
Dutch conspiracy theorists
University of Amsterdam alumni